Jordan Fuller (born March 4, 1998) is an American football strong safety for the Los Angeles Rams of the National Football League (NFL). He played college football at Ohio State, and was drafted by the Rams in the sixth round of the 2020 NFL Draft.

Early life and high school
Fuller was born to Bart Fuller and Cindy Mizelle on March 4, 1998. 
 His mother is a professional touring singer who has performed with Bruce Springsteen, the Rolling Stones, Whitney Houston and Luther Vandross, among others. He grew up in Norwood, New Jersey and attended Northern Valley Regional High School at Old Tappan. He played multiple positions for the Golden Knights and was named the Gatorade Player of the Year for New Jersey and the State Player of the Year by NJ.com as a senior after rushing for 747 yards and 10 touchdowns, catching 33 passes for 886 yards and five touchdowns and throwing for 135 yards on offense and making 44 tackles and intercepting six passes on defense.

College career
Fuller played in all 13 of the Buckeyes games as a true freshman, playing mostly on special teams with 71 snaps played on defense and making 11 tackles. Fuller was named Ohio State's starting safety going into his sophomore year, replacing Malik Hooker. He finished the season with 70 tackles, including a team-leading 57 solo stops, two tackles for loss and two interceptions and was named third-team All-Big Ten Conference and was named a Big Ten Distinguished Scholar.

Fuller was named a team captain going into his junior year. He recorded 81 tackles, second highest on the team, with one interception, four passes broken up and two fumble recoveries. He was named second-team All-Big Ten by the league's coaches and honorable mention by the media and was named an Academic All-American. Fuller entered his senior season on the Jim Thorpe Award and Bronko Nagurski Trophy watchlists and was named a second-team preseason All-American by the Associated Press. Fuller was named a semifinalist for the Jason Witten Man of the Year award and the Lott IMPACT Trophy and a finalist for the William V. Campbell Trophy. Fuller was named first-team All-Big Ten after finishing the season with 62 tackles, two interceptions, four pass break-ups, and recovered a fumble.

Professional career

Fuller was selected by the Los Angeles Rams in the sixth round, 199th overall, of the 2020 NFL Draft.

2020
Fuller was named a starter at safety going into his rookie season. Fuller made his NFL debut on September 13, 2020 and made a team-high eight tackles in a 20-17 win. He suffered a shoulder injury in Week 5 and was placed on injured reserve on October 13, 2020. He was activated on November 14, 2020. In Week 11 against the Tampa Bay Buccaneers on Monday Night Football, Fuller recorded his first two career interceptions off of fellow 199th overall pick Tom Brady.  Fuller's second interception occurred late in the fourth quarter and it secured a 27–24 win for the Rams.

2021
Fuller entered the 2021 season as the Rams starting free safety. He suffered an ankle injury in Week 18 and was placed on injured reserve on January 12, 2022. He finished the season with a team-leading 113 tackles, four passes defensed, and one interception through 16 starts. The Rams went on to win Super Bowl LVI against the Cincinnati Bengals without Fuller.

2022
On October 8, 2022, Fuller was placed on injured reserve.

Personal life
Fuller's older brother, Devin Fuller, played college football at UCLA and spent two seasons with the Atlanta Falcons. He is the nephew of comedian Sinbad.

References

External links
Ohio State Buckeyes bio
Los Angeles Rams bio

1998 births
Living people
Ohio State Buckeyes football players
American football safeties
Northern Valley Regional High School at Old Tappan alumni
Players of American football from New Jersey
Sportspeople from Bergen County, New Jersey
People from Norwood, New Jersey
Los Angeles Rams players
Ed Block Courage Award recipients